Ronald Alfred Taylor (25 March 1909 – 29 August 1986) was an English first-class cricketer active 1932–35 who played for Nottinghamshire. He was born and died in Nottingham.

References

1909 births
1986 deaths
English cricketers
Nottinghamshire cricketers